Diego Gutiérrez may refer to:

Politicians
Diego Gutiérrez y Toledo (1510–1544), Spanish governor in Costa Rica
Diego Gutiérrez de Humanes (1607–1660s), Spanish governor in Argentina

Sportspeople
Diego Gutiérrez (soccer, born 1972), American soccer midfielder
Diego Gutiérrez (volleyball) (born 1976), Argentine volleyball player
Diego Gutiérrez (footballer, born 1993), Mexican football defender
Diego Gutiérrez (soccer, born 1997), Canadian soccer midfielder
Diego Gutierrez (soccer, born 1999), American soccer forward
Diego Gutiérrez (footballer, born 2000), Spanish footballer

Others
Diego Gutiérrez (cartographer) (fl. 16th century), Spanish map maker
Diego Gutiérrez (singer-songwriter) (born 1974), Cuban singer-songwriter